Xiangcheng County is a county in the west of Sichuan Province, China, bordering Yunnan province to the south. It is under the administration of the Garzê Tibetan Autonomous Prefecture.

Climate

Terrain maps

References

External links

 
Populated places in the Garzê Tibetan Autonomous Prefecture
County-level divisions of Sichuan